Mandevilla splendens, the shining mandevilla, is a species of flowering plant in the family Apocynaceae. It is an evergreen vine, native to Brazil.

The flowers are rose-pink with yellow centers, appearing from late spring to early summer. In temperate zones it can be placed outside during the summer months, but must have protection in winter. It requires a sheltered spot in full sun. It has gained the Royal Horticultural Society’s Award of Garden Merit.

References

splendens
Endemic flora of Brazil